The 2012 Prémio Autores was the third edition of the Prémio Autores. It took place on 27 February 2012 and was broadcast by RTP.

Winners and nominees
Winners are listed first and highlighted in boldface.

Film
Best Screenplay
João Canijo (Blood of My Blood)
Luísa Costa Gomes and Edgar Pêra (O Barão)
Alberto Seixas Santos and Catarina Ruivo (E o Tempo Passa)
Best Film
Blood of My Blood, by João Canijo
E o Tempo Passa, by Alberto Seixas Santos
48, by Susana de Sousa Dias
Best Actress
Rita Blanco (Blood of My Blood)
Beatriz Batarda (Cisne)
Anabela Moreira (Blood of My Blood)
Best Actor
Nuno Melo (O Barão)
Nuno Lopes (Blood of My Blood)
Raul Solnado (América)

Radio
Best Radio Program
Caderneta de Cromos, by Nuno Markl (Rádio Comercial)
A Cena do Ódio, by David Ferreira
No Fim da Rua, by Nuno Amaral

Dance
Best Choreography
Icosahedron, by Tânia Carvalho
Um Gesto Que Não Passa de Uma Ameaça, by Sofia Dias and Vítor Roriz
The Old King, by Miguel Moreira and Romeu Runa

Music
Best Song
"E Fomos Pela Água do Rio", by Fausto Bordalo Dias
"Fado Insulano", by Zeca Medeiros
"O Acesso Bloqueado", by Sérgio Godinho
Best Album
Em Busca das Montanhas Azuis, by Fausto Bordalo Dias
Cantos da Babilónia, by Pedro Osório
Lisboa Mulata, by Dead Combo
Best Erudite Music Work
Interpretação da Integral de Chopin, by Artur Pizarro
Os Apóstolos, by the Coro Gregoriano de Lisboa
Nise Lacrimosa, by Luís Carvalho

Literature
Best Narrative Fiction Book
Tiago Veiga. Uma Biografia, by Mário Cláudio
A Cidade de Ulisses, by Teolinda Gersão
O Filho de Mil Homens, by Valter Hugo Mãe
Best Poetry Book
A Mão na Água Que Corre, by José Manuel de Vasconcelos
Lendas da Índia, by Luís Filipe Castro Mendes
Adornos, by Ana Marques Gastão
Best Children's and Juvenile Book
A Casa Sincornizada, written by Inês Pupo and Gonçalo Pratas, illustrated by Pedro Brito
Quando Eu For Grande, written by Maria Inês Almeida, illustrated by Sebastião Peixoto
Mariana e Manuel Numa Curva do Caminho, by Margarida da Fonseca Santos and Maria João Lopo de Carvalho

Theatre
Best Performed Portuguese Text
Israel, by Pedro Penim
Horror, by Mickael de Oliveira
Estocolmo, by Daniel Jonas
Best Show
A Varanda, by Luís Miguel Cintra
A Missão - Recordações de Uma Revolução, by Mónica Calle
Overdrama, by Jorge Andrade
Best Actress
Luísa Cruz (A Varanda)
Ana Guiomar (Purga)
Sandra Faleiro (Who's Afraid of Virginia Wolf?)
Best Actor
Luís Miguel Cintra (Ela)
Carlos Malvarez (Purga)
Elmano Sancho (Não Se Brinca Com o Amor)

Television
Best Information Program
Linha da Frente, by Mafalda Gameiro (RTP1)
O Eixo do Mal, by Nuno Artur Silva (SIC Notícias)
Câmara Clara, by Paula Moura Pinheiro and Teotónio Bernardo (RTP2)
Best Fiction Program
O Último a Sair, by Bruno Nogueira, Frederico Pombares, João Quadros, Sérgio Graciano, André Banza and Ricardo Freitas (RTP1)
Laços de Sangue, by Pedro Lopes and Patrícia Sequeira
Pai à Força, by Pedro Lopes and Duarte Teixeira
Best Entertainment Program
Cuidado com a Língua, by José Mário Costa and Ricardo Freitas
Estado de Graça, by Maria João Cruz and Fernando Ávila
Estranha Forma de Vida, by Jaime Fernandes

Visual arts
Best Plastic Arts Exhibition
Fora de Escala, by Manuel Baptista
Desenho Habitado, by Fernando Brízio
Colectiva Trinta Anos Prémios AICA/MC, by Manuel Graça Dias
Best Photographic Work
O PREC Já Não Mora Aqui, by João Pina
TNSC - A Prospectus Archive, by Paulo Catrica
Um Diário da República, by Kameraphoto
Best Scenographic Work
A Varanda, by Cristina Reis
Memorabilia, by José Capela
A Missão - Recordações de Uma Revolução, by Mónica Calle

References

2011 film awards
2011 music awards
2012 in Portugal